Nyhavn 33 is a listed property overlooking the Nyhavn canal in central Copenhagen, Denmark.

History

17th and 18th centuries

The property was by 1689 as No. 12 in St. Ann's East Quarter (Sankt Annæ Øster Kvarter) owned by skipper Jørgen Olsen. The current building was constructed for him some time around 1684. The property was by 1756 as No. 17 owned by skibsmåler Rasmus Hansen.

The third floor was added in 1767.

The property had by 1787 been acquired by Rasmus Christensen Kock (Koch), a manufacturer of ship sails, flags and compasses. He lived in the building with his wife Birthe Maria Wogstrup, a 26-year old son and a 20-year-old daughter from the wife first marriage, the daughter's three children (aged nine to 11) and his own two sisters. The sailor Lars Madsen Hviid, two maids (aged 20 and 21) and seven apprentices (aged 17 to 20) were also part of the large household.

19th century

At the time of the 1801 census, Koch and his wife resided in the building with Kich's 44-year-old brother Johanne Marie Kock,	the 45-year-old widow Anne Magdalene Lystrup, the widow's 25-year-old son Rasmus Lystrup	(theology student) and six employees in Koch's business (five of them apprentices).

The property was again listed as No. 17 in the new cadastre of 1806. It was by then still owned by Rasmus Christensen Koch.

At the time of the 1834 census, No. 17 was home to four households.  Christian Lystrup, a manufacturer of sails, flags and compasses, resided on the second floor with his wife Berthe Marie Holst, his cousin Birgitte Marie Haagensen, the wife's sister 	Anne Marie Holst, the theologian/teacher Rasmus Lystrup	(probably another relative), two apprentices (aged 16 and 19) and a maid. Morten Andersen, a ship captain and former portrait painter, resided on the ground floor with Marie Cathrine Andersen, their six children (aged one to 23) and two maids. Hanne Oder, a 69-year-old widow, resided on the first floor with the daughter 
Anne Marie Oder, a chamber maid (husjomfru) and a maid. Clemens Clemensen Hammeløv, chief of the "fathomers" and loaders" ("Faunsætterne og Læsserne", handlers of firewood), resided in the basement with his Clemens Clemensen Hammeløv	and two children (aged 11 and 22).

The military officer C. I. von Flensborg (1804-1852) lived in the building in 1838-1839. He served as Chief of Staff of the Royal Danish Army in 1849-1850 and served as Minister of Defence in 1851-1852.  The fourth floor was added in 1850.

At the time of the 1840 census, No. 17 was home to  22 residents. Morten Andersen had now moved to the first floor apartment. Jens Hostrup Schultz, a 30-year-old former farmer, was the new tenant on the ground floor. He lived there with his wife Vincentrine From, their two-year-old son and one maid. The tavern in the basement had now been taken over by a sailor, Niels Mortensen, who lived there with his wife and five-year-old son, a maid and three lodgers.

The property was home to 30 residents in seven households in 1860. Ane Kathrine Andersen, widow of a grocer, resided in the building with her three children (aged seven to 12) and one maid. Niels Christian Olsen, a building painter, resided in the building with his wife Helene Sophie Olsen f. Petersen and their one-year-old daughter. Bærtel Jespersen, a 32-year-old man, resided in the building with his wife Nilssine Jespersen	 and their two-year-old son. Hans Madsen Bremholm, a harbour master's assistant, resided in the building with his wife Bodel Magrete Bremholm (née Jensen) and one maid. Anna Marie Kryger, widow of a farmer, resided in the building with her four children (aged 18 to 34). Johan Julius Kreye, a grocer (urtekræmmer) resided in the building with his wife Emilie Augusta Kreye and one maid. Jens Mikkelsen Winther, proprietor of the tavern in the basement, resided in the associated dwelling with his wife Johanne Winther (née Bechmann), their 11-year-od son, a two-year-old foster daughter, two lodgers and one maid.

20th century

The building was listed by the Danish Heritage Agency in the Danish national registry of protected buildings in 1945. A tobacconist was for many years located in the ground floor. It was later succeeded by Nyhavnscaféen.

Architecture

Above the main entrance is a stone relief featuring the name "R. Koch", a compass rose, a Dannebrog and two sand clocks.. Two side wings from 1784 project from the rear side of the building.

Today
NyhavnC is now based in the building. It consists of a restaurant, a café and a bar.

References

External links

 Nyhavn at indenforvoldene.dk

Houses in Copenhagen
Listed residential buildings in Copenhagen